Delta-Gnom was an Austrian manufacturer founded in 1923 producing J.A.P.-engined motorcycles until the early 1930s.  Production resumed after World War II using Rotax engines, until 1955.

Notes

Motorcycle manufacturers of Austria